Lieutenant General Sir James Adolphus Oughton KB (1720 – 2 May 1780) was a British officer who was commander of forces in North Britain.

His monument in Westminster Abbey is by Richard Hayward.

References

External links
Info. at the Queen's Royal Surrey Regiment website

1720 births
1780 deaths
Knights Companion of the Order of the Bath
British Army generals
British Army personnel of the Jacobite rising of 1745
55th Regiment of Foot officers
37th Regiment of Foot officers
British Army personnel of the American Revolutionary War